Alvin Earl Maxson (November 12, 1951 - June 14, 2022) was an American football running back in the National Football League (NFL). He was drafted by the New Orleans Saints in the eighth round of the 1974 NFL Draft. He played college football at Southern Methodist.

Maxson also played for the Pittsburgh Steelers, Chicago Bears, Tampa Bay Buccaneers, Houston Oilers and New York Giants.

He died at the age of 70 on June 14, 2022, in Rio Rancho, New Mexico.

References

External links
Tampa Bay Buccaneers bio

1951 births
Living people
American football fullbacks
SMU Mustangs football players
New Orleans Saints players
Pittsburgh Steelers players
Chicago Bears players
Tampa Bay Buccaneers players
Houston Oilers players
New York Giants players